Umanak (Kalaallisut: Uummannaq, "Heart-shaped") was a former Moravian mission in mid-western Greenland, located upfjord from Neu-Herrnhut (modern Nuuk).

It was founded in 1861 and surrendered to the Lutheran Church of Denmark in 1900.

See also
 Uummannaq, the unrelated present settlement also sometimes spelt Umanak

References

Former populated places in Greenland
History of the Greenland work of the Moravian Church
1861 establishments in Greenland